The  is a Japanese professional basketball team based in Nagasaki Prefecture that competes in the second division of the B.League.

Franchise history

Foundation 
In 2020, Japanet announced the creation of Nagasaki Prefecture's first professional basketball club. The club was formally launched on July 10, and will compete in B3 or the third division of the B.League beginning the 2021–22 season. The company is responsible for the operation and promotion of the basketball club as well as the management of the athletes. The company headquarters is located in Manzaimachi, Nagasaki City, Nagasaki Prefecture. 

On January 26, 2021, the team announced that Takumi Ito will serve as the head coach and general manager.

Naming the team 
In July 2020, the management asked suggestions for the team name. To select the team name, online voting was done and voting events were also held in different parts of the Nagasaki Prefecture. On October 30, the club name Nagasaki Velca was unveiled. "Velca" is derived from the words "welcome," "well community" and "victory."

Promotion to B2 
The team finished their inaugural season with 42 wins and 3 losses, setting a B3 record with a .933 winning percentage. They were subsequently named B3 Champions and earned a promotion to B2 or the second division of the B.League. On May 17, 2022, the team announced that Takumi Ito will continue to serve as the general manager and Kenjiro Maeda, who was the team's associate head coach, will take over as the head coach beginning the 2022–23 season. On May 29, B.League announced that Nagasaki will compete in the West conference of B2.

Uniform

Jersey sponsors 
On April 29, 2021, the team announced that Nishikawa is the jersey sponsor beginning the 2021–22 season.

Current roster

Notable players 

To appear in this section a player must have either: 
- Set a club record or won an individual award as a professional player. 
- Played at least one official international match for his senior national team.

  Masaya Karimata
  Javier Carter

Head coaches 
  Takuma Ito: 2021–2022
  Kenjiro Maeda: 2022–present

Management

Ownership

General managers

Arenas 
 Nagasaki Prefectural Gymnasium
The team is set to open a new arena in 2024.

Practice facilities 

Fanbase 
The fan club of the team is called .

References

External links 

Nagasaki Velca
Basketball teams in Japan
Sports teams in Nagasaki Prefecture
Basketball teams established in 2020
2020 establishments in Japan